Un beau matin is the first solo album (and his third overall) by French experimental singer and composer Areski Belkacem, released in 1970 on the Saravah label. He would not release a new solo album until Le Triomphe de l'amour in 2010, instead collaborating with his lover and creative partner Brigitte Fontaine for the next few decades.

Track listing

References

1970 albums
Areski Belkacem albums